Lu Shi'e (1878–1944) was a Chinese writer who previously worked as a doctor. His hometown was southwest of Shanghai. He wrote fanxin xiaoshuo works.

In 1910 he wrote Xin Zhongguo ("New China"). Xin Zhongguo depicted a universal exposition in Shanghai. Xu Leiying of China Radio International stated that he predicted the Shanghai Expo.

Roland Altenberger, author of The Sword Or the Needle: The Female Knight-errant (xia) in Traditional Chinese Narrative, wrote that Lu Shi'e was classified as an "obscure" author prior to a 2000 symposium on Lu Shi'e in Shanghai. According to Altenburger, Princeton University's Gest Oriental Library, home to the East Asian Library and the Gest Collection, has the largest collection of works made by Lu Shi'e.

Works
 I yao nan chên ("Guide to medicine")
 Xin Zhongguo ("New China")
 Qing Shi Yanyi (清史演義/清史演义 "Embellished History of the Qing" – 1913–1917)

References

Further reading

 Chen, Xi'nan. "Lu Shi'e jiashi shengping jiqi zhushu xinkao."
 Hong, Tao. "Lu Shi'e Xin Shuihu yu jinda Shuihu xindu."

20th-century Chinese physicians
1878 births
1944 deaths
20th-century Chinese writers
Writers from Shanghai
Republic of China novelists
Republic of China historians
Physicians from Shanghai
Historians from Shanghai